The Ministry of Cooperatives (Vâzart-e T'avân) established in 1991 was  an Iranian government body responsible for the oversight of Cooperative business in Iran. The Ministry of Cooperatives was merged with the Ministry of Labour and Ministry of Social Welfare in 2011.

Notable people
Former and first Minister of Ministry of Cooperatives, Labor and Social Welfare Reza Sheykoleslam was a governor of Hormozgan Province .

The last minister of Ministry of Cooperatives before its merger with Ministry of Labor and Ministry of Social Welfare Mohammad Abbasi is the most successful minister of sports with 4 gold, 5 silver and 3 bronze medals.

Former Vice Minister of Ministry of Cooperatives Bahman Salehi currently manages the renewable energy corporation SUNIR.

Former General Director of Planning of Ministry of Cooperatives Alireza Nasiri is the founder of online degree programs in Iran and involved in commercial forestation in Iran.

Former Minister of Ministry of Cooperatives, Labor and Social Welfare Asadollah Abbasi is a parliamentary representative for Rudsar.

See also
 History of the cooperative movement

References

External links
 Webpage of the Ministry of Cooperatives

Ministries established in 1991
2011 disestablishments in Iran
1991 establishments in Iran
Cooperatives
Cooperatives ministries